Lake Urmia is an endorheic salt lake in Iran. The lake is located between the provinces of East Azerbaijan and West Azerbaijan in Iran, and west of the southern portion of the Caspian Sea.

By late 2017, the lake had shrunk to 10% of its former size (and 1/60 of water volume in 1998) due to persistent general drought in Iran, but also the damming of the local rivers that flow into it, and the pumping of groundwater from the surrounding area. This dry spell was broken in 2019 and the lake is now filling up once again, due to both increased rain and water diversion from the Zab River by the Lake Urmia Restoration Program.

Lake Urmia, along with its approximately 102 (former) islands, is protected as a national park by the Iranian Department of Environment.

Names and etymologies

Richard Nelson Frye suggested an Urartian origin for the name, while T. Burrow connected the origin of the name Urmia to Indo-Iranian urmi- "wave" and urmya- "undulating, wavy". A more likely etymology would be from Neo-Aramaic Assyrian-Chaldean spoken by the shrinking number of the ancient Christian population of the nearby city of Urmia, consisting of ur meaning "city," and mia meaning "water." Together, the "water city", what Urmia city is: a city on the waters of the eponymous lake. The name could also derive from the combination of the Assyrian Aramaic words Ur (a common name for cities around Mesopotamia, meaning "city") and Mia, "City of Water" referring to the city nearby.

Locally, the lake is referred to in Persian as Daryâče-ye Orumiye, in Azerbaijani as Urmu gölü, and in Kurdish as Deryaçeya Wirmê. The traditional Armenian name is Kaputan tsov, literally "blue sea". Residents of Shahi Island refer to the lake in Azerbaijani as Daryā (meaning "Sea").

Its Old Persian name was Chichast, meaning "glittering", a reference to the glittering mineral particles suspended in the water of the lake and found along its shores. In medieval times it came to be known as Lake Spauta or Lake Kabuda (Kabodan) in Armenian geography, from the word for "azure" in Persian, or kapuyt in Armenian.

Archaeology and history
The Lake Urmia region has a wealth of archaeological sites going back to the Neolithic period. Archaeological excavations of the settlements in the area have found artifacts that date from about 7,000 BCE and later.

Excavations at Teppe Hasanlu archeological site southwest of Lake Urmia also revealed habitations going back to the 6th millennium BCE.

A related site is Yanik Tepe, on the east shore of Lake Urmia, that has been excavated in the 1950s and 60s by C. A. Burney.

Another important site in the area, from about the same era, is Hajji Firuz Tepe, where some of the oldest archaeological evidence of grape-based wine was discovered.

Kul Tepe Jolfa is a site in the Jolfa County about 10 km south from the Araxes River. It dates to Chalcolithic period (5000–4500 BCE).

Se Girdan kurgans are located on the south shore of Lake Urmia. Some of them were excavated in 1968 and 1970 by O. Muscarella. They have now been redated to the second half of the 4th millennium, although originally they were thought to be much younger.

One of the early mentions of Lake Urmia is from Assyrian records of the 9th century BCE. There, in the records from the reign of Shalmaneser III (858–824 BCE), two names are mentioned in the area of Lake Urmia: Parsuwaš (i.e. the Persians) and Matai (i.e. the Mitanni). It is not completely clear whether these referred to places or tribes, or what their relationship was to the subsequent list of personal names and "kings". But the Matai were Medes and linguistically the name Parsuwaš matches the Old Persian word pārsa, an Achaemenid ethnolinguistic designation.

The lake was the center of the Mannaean Kingdom. A potential Mannaean settlement, represented by the ruin mound of Hasanlu, was on the south side of the lake. Mannae was overrun by the Matiani or Matieni, an Iranian people variously identified as Scythian, Saka, Sarmatian, or Cimmerian. It is not clear whether the lake took its name from the people or the people from the lake, but the country came to be called Matiene or Matiane, and gave the lake its Latin name.

The Battle of Urmia was fought near the lake in 1604, during the Ottoman–Safavid War of 1603–1618.

In the last five hundred years the area around Lake Urmia has been home to Azerbaijanis, Kurds,  Iranians, Assyrians, and Armenians.

Chemistry
The main cations in the lake water include Na+, K+, Ca2+, Li+ and Mg2+, while Cl−, SO, HCO are the main anions. The Na+ and Cl− concentration is roughly four times the concentration of natural seawater. Sodium ions are at slightly higher concentration in the south compared to the north of the lake, which could result from the shallower depth in the south, and a higher net evaporation rate.

The lake is divided into north and south, separated by the Urmia Lake Bridge and its associated causeway, which was completed in 2008. The bridge provides only a  gap in the embankment, allowing little exchange of water between the two sections. Due to drought and increased demands for agricultural water in the lake's basin, the salinity of the lake has risen to more than 300 g/L during recent years, and large areas of the lake bed have been desiccated.

Ecology

Palaeoecology
A palynological investigation on long cores from Urmia Lake has revealed a nearly 200 kyr record of vegetation and lake level changes. The vegetation has changed from the Artemisia/grass steppes during the glacial/stadial periods, to oak-juniper steppe-forests during the interglacial/interstadial periods. The lake has had a complex hydrological history and its water levels have fluctuated greatly in geological history. Very high lake levels have been suggested for some time intervals during the two last glacial periods, as well as during both the Last Interglacial as well as the Holocene. The lowest lake levels have occurred during the last glacial periods.

Modern ecology
Based on the latest checklists of biodiversity at Lake Urmia in 2014 and 2016, it is home of 62 species of archaebacteria and bacteria, 42 species of microfungi, 20 species of phytoplankton, 311 species of plants, five species of mollusca, 226 species of birds, 27 species of amphibians and reptiles and 24 species of mammals (47 fossils have been recorded in the area).

Lake Urmia is an internationally registered protected area as both a UNESCO Biosphere Reserve and a Ramsar site. The Iranian Dept. of Environment has designated most of the lake as a National Park.

The lake is marked by more than a hundred small, rocky islands, which serve as stopover points during the migrations of a number of bird species, including flamingos, pelicans, spoonbills, ibises, storks, shelducks, avocets, stilts, and gulls. A recent drought has significantly decreased the annual amount of water the lake receives. This in turn has increased the salinity of the lake's water, reducing its viability as home to thousands of migratory birds, including a large flamingo populations. The salinity has particularly increased in the half of the lake north of the Urmia Lake Bridge.

By virtue of its high salinity, the lake no longer sustains any fish species. Nonetheless, Urmia Lake is considered a significant natural habitat of Artemia, which serve as food source for the migratory birds such as flamingos. In early 2013, the then-head of the Iranian Artemia Research Center was quoted that Artemia urmiana had gone extinct due to the drastic increases in salinity. However this assessment has been contradicted, and another population of this species has recently been discovered in the Koyashskoye Salt Lake at the Crimean Peninsula.

Falling level and increasing salinity

The lake is a major barrier between Urmia and Tabriz, two of the most important cities in the provinces of West Azerbaijan and East Azerbaijan. A project to build a highway across the lake was initiated in the 1970s but was abandoned after the Iranian Revolution of 1979, leaving a  causeway with an unbridged gap. The project was revived in the early 2000s, and was completed in November 2008 with the opening of the  Urmia Lake Bridge across the remaining gap. The highly saline environment is already heavily rusting the steel on the bridge despite anti-corrosion treatment. Experts have warned that the construction of the causeway and bridge, together with a series of ecological factors, will eventually lead to the drying up of the lake, turning it into a salt marsh, which will adversely affect the climate of the region.

Although measures are now being taken to reverse the trend the lake has shrunk by 60% and could disappear entirely. Only 5% of the lake's water remains.

On 2 August 2012, Muhammad-Javad Muhammadizadeh, the head of Iran's Environment Protection Organization, announced that Armenia had agreed to transfer water from Armenia to counter the critical fall in Lake Urmia's water level, remarking that "hot weather and a lack of precipitation have brought the lake to its lowest water levels ever recorded". He added that recovery plans for the lake included the transfer of water from Eastern Azerbaijan Province. Previously, Iranian authorities had announced a plan to transfer water from the Aras River, which borders Iran and Azerbaijan, but the 950-billion-toman plan was abandoned due to Azerbaijan's objections.

In July 2014, Iran President Hassan Rouhani approved plans for a 14 trillion rial program (over $500 million) in the first year of a recovery plan. The money is supposed to be used for water management, reducing farmers' water use, and environmental restoration. Several months earlier, in March 2014, Iran's Department of Environment and the United Nations Development Programme (UNDP) issued a plan to save the lake and the nearby wetland, which called for spending $225 million in the first year and $1.3 billion overall for restoration.

Starting in 2016, Food and Agriculture Organization of the United Nations (FAO) and Urmia Lake Restoration Program (ULRP) signed up to a project funded by the Government of Japan entitled "An Integrated Programme for Sustainable Water Resources Management in the Lake Urmia Basin" to support ULRP in its goal to restore Lake Urmia. The project set out a multi-disciplinary framework covering several key interrelated areas and aims to have five outputs: 1. An advanced water accounting (WA) system for the entire Lake Urmia basin; 2. A drought management system based on risk/vulnerability assessment and preparedness response for the basin; 3. A socio-economic livelihood programme with viable and sustainable alternatives to current agricultural activities upstream of the lake to reduce water consumption significantly while maintaining the income and livelihood of affected communities; 4. An integrated watershed management (WM) programme; A capacity development programme to strengthen stakeholders at different levels.

The Silveh Dam in Piranshahr County should be complete in 2015.

In 2015, president Hassan Rouhani's cabinet approved $660 million for improving irrigation systems, and steps to combat desertification.

In September 2018, A working group tasked with reviving Lake Urmia has started to grow two types of plants to save the region from salt particles. The two plants are Nitraria or Karadagh and Tamarix or Shoorgaz, which are planted on the land of Jabal Kandi village in Urmia County, to slow down the wind that brings with itself the salt particles.

Environmental protests
The prospect that Lake Urmia might dry up entirely has drawn protests in Iran and abroad, directed at both the regional and national governments. Protests flared in late August 2011 after the Iranian parliament voted not to provide funds to channel water from the Aras River to raise the lake level. Apparently, parliament proposed instead to relocate people living around Urmia Lake.

More than 30 activists were detained on 24 August 2011 during an iftar meal. In the absence of a right to protest publicly in Iran, protesters have incorporated their messages into chants at football matches. On 25 August, several soccer fans were detained before and after the Tabriz derby match between Tractor Sazi F.C. and Shahrdari Tabriz F.C. for shouting slogans in favor of protecting the lake, including "Urmia Lake is dying, the Majlis [parliament] orders its execution".

Further demonstrations took place in the streets of Tabriz and Urmia on 27 August and 3 September 2011. Amateur video from these events showed riot police on motorcycles attacking apparently peaceful protesters. According to the governor of West Azerbaijan, at least 60 supporters of the lake were arrested in Urmia, and dozens in Tabriz, because they had not applied for a permit to organize a demonstration.

The effect of climate change on the lake, has been extensively covered by an Iranian photojournalist Solmaz Daryani.

Islands

Lake Urmia had approximately 102 islands. Shahi Island was historically the lake's largest. However, it became a peninsula connected to the eastern shore when the lake level dropped.

Shahi Island is the burial place of both Hulagu Khan (one of Genghis Khan's grandsons) and of Hulagu's son Abaqa. Both khans were buried in a castle above  cliffs along the shore of the island.

In 1967, the Iranian Department of Environment sent a team of scientists to study the ecology of Shahi Island. Various results of the study, which included the breeding habits of brine shrimp, were published by Javad Hashemi in the scientific journal, Iranian Scientific Sokhan. A herd of Iranian antelope and gazelle were introduced into the islands, some of which survive to the present day. The Persian leopards that were also introduced to check the number of these antelopes survived for years, going extinct sometime in the early 1980s.

Basin rivers
Lake Urmia is fed by 13 permanent rivers and many small springs, as well as rainfall directly into the lake. Nearly half the inflow comes from the Zarrineh River and Simineh River. There is no outflow from the lake so water is only lost through evaporation.

Aji Chay
Alamlou River
Barandouz River
Gadar River
Ghaie River
Leylan River
Mahabad River
Nazlou River
Rozeh River
Shahar River
Simineh River
Zarrineh River
Zola River

In popular culture
Lake Urmia was the setting of the Iranian film The White Meadows (2009), which featured fantastic-looking lands adjacent to a salt sea. There are many popular songs about Lake Urmia in Azerbaijani language, such as "Urmu Gölü Lay Lay".

See also

 Ark of Nuh or Noah
 Urmia Lake Bridge
 List of drying lakes
 Mount Judi

References

External links

Iranica Encyclopedia: Eckhart Ehlers, "Lake Urmia", 2013
Encyclopedia of Earth: C. Michael Hogan, "Lake Urmia", 2011
Saline Systems; Urmia Salt Lake, Iran
Profile at UNESCO Biosphere Reserve Directory
Iran's Environmental Ticking Bomb 
Landsat -  Drying of Lake Urmia, Iran, Google Earth Engine
Aerial view of Lake Urmia

Urmia
Urmia
Landforms of East Azerbaijan Province
Landforms of West Azerbaijan Province
Urmia
Biosphere reserves of Iran
Urmia
Ramsar sites in Iran
Assyrian geography
Iranian Kurdistan
Articles containing video clips
Climate change in Iran